Yelkino is a rural locality (a village) in Andreyevskoye Rural Settlement, Alexandrovsky District, Vladimir Oblast, Russia. The population was 420 as of 2010. There are 10 streets.

Geography 
Yelkino is located 6 km east of Alexandrov (the district's administrative centre) by road. Mayak is the nearest rural locality.

References 

Rural localities in Alexandrovsky District, Vladimir Oblast